Liverbirds is an acoustic alternative album by punk rock singer Joey Cape of Lagwagon and southern rock singer Jon Snodgrass of Drag the River, self-released on April 1, 2010.

Production 
The album featured songs from Cape's bands Lagwagon and Bad Astronaut and from Snodgrass' bands Drag the River and Armchair Martian in new acoustic alternative country-flavored renditions. Each member contributed five songs, with one of Snodgrass's songs - "Spiderman, Wolfman" – being a previously unreleased new song.

Release 
The album was originally available for purchase at Cape and Snodgrass's acoustic shows during their European tour with Tony Sly in February 2010, but it was made available for online purchase on their webstore on April 1, 2010.

Track listing

Personnel
 Joey Cape - lead vocals (tracks 1–5), acoustic guitar, backing vocals
 Jon Snodgrass - lead vocals (tracks 6–10), acoustic guitar, backing vocals

References

Joey Cape albums
2010 albums